Sturla Böðvarsson (born 23 November 1945) is an Icelandic politician who was President of the Althing between 2007 and 2009. He is a member of the Independence Party and has been a member of the Althing since 1991, from the Western Constituency from 1991 to 2003 and from the North West Constituency since 2003. From 1999 to 2007, he was Minister of Communications. He was also the mayor of Stykkishólmur from 1974 to 1991 and 2014 to present.

References

Communications ministers of Iceland
Bodvarsson, Sturla
Bodvarsson, Sturla
Independence Party (Iceland) politicians
Speakers of the Althing